Norman David Willis (21 January 1933 – 7 June 2014) was the General Secretary of the Trades Union Congress (TUC) in the United Kingdom from 1984 to 1993, and President of the European Trade Union Confederation (ETUC) from 1991 to 1993.

Life
Willis was born in Ashford, Middlesex. He attended Ashford County Grammar School in Ashford, Middlesex, and studied at Ruskin College and Oriel College, Oxford. He was a Labour councillor on Staines UDC from 1971 to 1974.

Career

TGWU
He worked for the TGWU from 1949 to 1951, before two years' National Service. From 1959 to 1970 he was the personal assistant to the General Secretary of the TGWU.

TUC
He became assistant General Secretary of the TUC in 1974. The leadership of Norman Willis from 1984 coincided in the late 1980s with a period of considerable change for the Trade Union movement in the UK: union membership was falling; the movement was facing power-limiting legislation from the Conservative government; and the Labour Party was conducting a fundamental review of its policies and the nature of its links with the unions.

Personal life
He was a patron of the Embroiderers' Guild, a British embroidery organisation, and former President of the Arthur Ransome Society (TARS). He was a renowned raconteur. He married Maureen Kenning in 1963. They had a son and a daughter.

Willis died on 7 June 2014.

References

General Secretaries of the Trades Union Congress
Fellows of Oriel College, Oxford
1933 births
2014 deaths
People from Ashford, Surrey
People educated at Ashford County Grammar School